Visa requirements for South African citizens are administrative entry restrictions by the authorities of other states placed on citizens of the Republic of South Africa. As of 13 April 2021, South African citizens had visa-free or visa on arrival access to 108 countries and territories, ranking the South African passport 45th in terms of travel freedom according to 
the Global Passport power Rank 2023 report 

Where visa-free access is permitted, such access is not necessarily a right, and admission is at the discretion of border enforcement officers. Visitors engaging in activities other than tourism, including unpaid work, may require a visa or work permit.

It does not provide for where certain people under the assumption remained British Subjects without Citizenship, then later became British Overseas Citizens or British Subjects in 1983, there are different requirements. See Visa requirements for British Overseas citizens or South African nationality law.

Visa requirements map

Visa requirements 
This list provides for the period of stay under "Allowed Stay" generally for short stay activities where a Visa is not required in sovereign states.

Dependent, disputed, or restricted territories

Unrecognised or partially recognised countries

Dependent and autonomous territories

Other territories

Changes in Visa Requirements for South African Citizens

List of Changes

Visa Exemptions

In some instances, a Visa Exemption permits entry in lieu of obtaining a Visa/ Entry Visa if in possession of the following Visas or Permanent Relationships, this is not limited to entitlements or provisions laid down by the country's law, for instance, right to enter without prior authority due to background such as in the case of former Indian Citizens:

This list does not include the ability of a Visa Document Exemption/ Substitute for a Visa Application, for instance a US Visa as an exemption document for the issue of a Qatari e-Visa.

Summary of Visa Exemptions

List of Visa Exemptions

North America

United States of America - South African Citizens in possession of a valid United States Multiple Entry Visa in their passport may enter the following country(ies) visa-free for the time indicated beside, this also includes the countries consisting of the former Yugoslavia:

: 90 days;
 : 30 days;
 of the : 3 months (if arriving or transiting from the United States);
: 180 days, see note in Mexico under "Visa Requirements";
: 30 days;
: 15 days;
 : 15 days;
: 90 days.

Canada - South African Citizens in possession of a valid Canadian Multiple Entry Visa in their passport may enter the following country(ies) visa-free for the time indicated adjacent:

 of the : 3 months (if transiting or arriving from Canada):
: 180 days.

British Isles

United Kingdom and the Republic of Ireland

Right of Abode in the United Kingdom of Great Britain and Northern Ireland - South African Citizens who are in possession of a Valid Certificate of Entitlement substantiating their claim to the Right of Abode in the United Kingdom in their South African passport (as either a British National or South African/ Commonwealth Citizen) may enter the following Commonwealth Realms/ countries for the same period for as a South African Citizen who would usually a Visa but without the Right of Abode in the United Kingdom (+except the United Kingdom as right to reside is automatic):

: 6 months
: 
: +Indefinitely

South African citizens in possession of Leave to Remain or Enter holders(whether permanent or temporary)/ Ireland Biometric Visa or Permanent Residency holders:

Holder's of a United Kingdom Visa May enter:

 of the : 3 months (if arriving or transiting from the United Kingdom).

Australasia

Australia

Permanent Residence in the Commonwealth of Australia - South African Citizens with any type of a Valid Australian Permanent Resident Visa electronically granted or as a label still valid may enter the following country:

: Indefinite. Note: may apply for Permanent Residency in New Zealand after satisfying two years residence with an Australian Resident Visa in New Zealand. Australian Resident Visa is a New Zealand (Indefinite) Visa which is granted at the New Zealand border to Australian Permanent Residents in the form of an entry stamp, if the holder leaves New Zealand the Visa would therefore end and the time spent would not count towards satisfying the Two Year Residence requirement in order to become a New Zealand Permanent Resident (2 years) or a Citizen (5 years). Australian Resident Visa is the name of the Visa given to Australian Permanent Residents or Australian Citizens upon arrival in New Zealand.

Holder's must also consider that they will be able to return to Australia as a Permanent Resident should the expiry of their travel facility on their Australian Permanent Residence occur whilst they are in New Zealand. The Australian Resident Visa granted in New Zealand is indefinite if in New Zealand, however expires when leaving.

As of 1 October 2019, Australian Permanent Residents need to apply for a New Zealand Electronic Travel Authority (NZeTA) if they wish to enter New Zealand. The ETA is valid for 2 years however there is no time limit on the length of stay, this is just the time the holder must enter within. The cost is NZD 9 on the mobile app and NZD 12 on the internet per traveller and takes about 5 minutes to complete. The aim is to preauthorise travel to New Zealand. Once the Australian Permanent Resident arrives, they will be granted a New Zealand Visa for Australian Residents (Australian Resident Visa) subject to satisfying character requirements. It is very important to consider three things: Validity of Australian Permanent Residence in order to return to Australia or New Zealand, Validity of NZeTA and leaving New Zealand. Leaving New Zealand will terminate the New Zealand Visa for Australian Resident, if the Australian Permanent Resident Visa is not Valid then they will not be able to return to New Zealand or Australia. There are no other costs involved. https://www.immigration.govt.nz/new-zealand-visas/apply-for-a-visa/about-visa/australian-resident-visa

European Union

European Union Family Member - South African Citizens who are travelling with or joining their EU family members in the European Union in a Country other than where their family member is a citizen of does not require a Visa to enter and enjoy the same entry rights and stay, however this would be difficult to prove and as a result, entry could be refused. Visa should be applied for in advance which is usually with no or minimal requirements to meet if the applicant is a family member of an EU Citizen. For instance, a person who wants to travel with their spouse to France where their spouse is a Citizen of the Republic of Lithuania should apply for a Schengen Visa in advance or where a person wants to join their Lithuanian spouse who resides in France should also apply for a Schengen Visa in order to prove their right and avoid misconception. In most cases, airlines will not permit travel without a visa. There is no time limit a family member can stay (indefinite stay), they must just enter before the Visa expires if joining their family or travelling at the same time. There are no costs involved either. European Union citizens and their South African family members will need to apply for settled or pre-settled status if they wish continue residing in the UK after 31 December 2020. Settled Status can be granted when the applicant has resided in the UK for 5 years and is valid indefinitely. In order to maintain settled status, people must visit the UK every 5 years. Pre-Settled status is granted when the applicant has resided in the UK for less than 5 years and is valid for 5 years. In order to maintain pre-settled status, people must visit the UK every two years. However, applicants would have to meet continuous residence until they reach 5 years if they want to qualify for settled status after 31 December 2020. It will not be possible to be granted another pre-settled Visa.

Schengen Visa (Long Stay) - Holder's of a Valid Long Stay Category D Visa who arrive in the Schengen European country of their Visa and apply for a Residence Card shortly after arriving will be able to use their EU residence permit/ card for travel within the Schengen States, if granted.

Non-visa restrictions

Consular protection of South African citizens abroad

See also

 Visa policy of South Africa

References and Notes
References

Notes

South Africa
Foreign relations of South Africa